Maulwi Saelan (8 August 1928 – 10 October 2016) was an Indonesian footballer. play as a goalkeeper He competed in the men's tournament at the 1956 Summer Olympics.

Honours

Indonesia
Asian Games Bronze medal: 1958

References

External links
 
 

1928 births
2016 deaths
Indonesian footballers
Indonesia international footballers
Olympic footballers of Indonesia
Footballers at the 1956 Summer Olympics
Sportspeople from Makassar
Association football goalkeepers
Asian Games medalists in football
Asian Games bronze medalists for Indonesia
Footballers at the 1958 Asian Games
Medalists at the 1958 Asian Games
PSM Makassar players
20th-century Indonesian people
21st-century Indonesian people